is a 60-story, mixed-use skyscraper located in Ikebukuro, Toshima, Tokyo, adjoining the Sunshine City complex. At the time of its completion in 1978, the 239.7 m (786 ft) building was the tallest in Asia, a title it held until 1985 when it was surpassed by the 63 Building in Seoul. Sunshine 60 was also the tallest building in Tokyo and Japan until the Tokyo Metropolitan Government Building was completed in 1991, and housed the world's fastest elevators (at ) until the opening of the Yokohama Landmark Tower in 1993; Mitsubishi Electric installed the elevators at the former's highest-rise bank as well as the latter, and Mitsubishi Estate owns both buildings.

Construction
Sunshine 60's foundation is made of reinforced concrete. The lower segment of the building is also reinforced concrete with a steel skeleton. The upper tower is a steel skeleton with "slitted shear walls". These unique walls were inserted between columns in the core, allowing the walls to conform to deformations in the steel frame caused by earthquakes and wind shear helping to assure structural integrity. A rigid framing structural system creates the frame. Mechanical equipment is located directly above the core of the structure on its rooftop.

Sunshine 60 was erected over the site of the destroyed Sugamo Prison, famously used to hold senior Japanese war criminals during the occupation. On December 23, 1948, seven high-ranking, convicted war criminals (including former Prime Minister Hideki Tojo) were hanged at the prison. It was also the site of the hanging of Soviet spy Richard Sorge during the war. In popular modern lore, the area is rumored to be haunted.

Facilities
As a mixed-use high-rise, Sunshine 60's space is used for a variety of purposes. Floors 1 through 9 are used as commercial space and house a post office, banks, showrooms, cafeterias, a health care center and a day care center. Office space occupies floors 10 through 57. Restaurants are located on the 58th and 59th floors.

From the 60th floor, visitors can see as far as 100 km on a clear day from Sunshine 60's observation deck (admission fee up to ¥620). To get visitors to the observation deck quickly, the observation deck bank of the tower's 40 elevators takes passengers directly from the lobby at a speed of 600 meters per minute (36 km/h, 22 mph). Between its opening and 1993 (the opening of Yokohama Landmark Tower), the observation deck elevators were the fastest in the world.

Office tenants
The office floors house the headquarters of Credit Saison, FamilyMart, NTT Plala and Sammy Corporation, among other office tenants.

Image gallery

See also

 Sunshine City
 Ancient Orient Museum

References

External links
 Official site 
 360° View from Sunshine 60 Observatory

|-

|-

Ikebukuro
Office buildings completed in 1978
Skyscraper office buildings in Tokyo
Retail buildings in Tokyo
1978 establishments in Japan
Buildings and structures in Toshima